God Loves Ugly is the second studio album by American hip hop group Atmosphere. It was released on Rhymesayers Entertainment on June 11, 2002.

Release 
The album, via distribution with Fat Beats, went on to sell more than 130,000 copies in the United States. The single from the album, titled "Modern Man's Hustle", reached #18 on the Billboard Hot Rap Tracks chart.

On January 20, 2009, God Loves Ugly was re-released with a bonus DVD, featuring cameos from Eyedea, Aesop Rock and Crescent Moon, among others. Originally released as Sad Clown Bad Dub 4, the DVD features two hours of live performance footage, special guest appearances, and music videos for "GodLovesUgly", "Summer Song", and "Say Shh".

Reception and legacy 

At Metacritic, which assigns a weighted average score out of 100 to reviews from mainstream critics, God Loves Ugly received an average score of 76% based on 9 reviews, indicating "generally favorable reviews".

In 2011, "Modern Man's Hustle" ranked at number 6 on Complexs "25 Best Rhymesayers Songs" list.

In 2015, God Loves Ugly was listed by HipHopDX as one of the "30 Best Underground Hip Hop Albums Since 2000".

Track listing

Personnel 
 Ant – Production
 Slug – Vocals
 Mankwe Ndosi – vocal accompaniment on "GodLovesUgly" and "Shrapnel"
 George Faber – harmonica help on "Give Me"
 Sara Lindsay – vocal accompaniment on "Fuck You Lucy"
 Sara Schrantz – vocal accompaniment on "Fuck You Lucy"

Charts

References

External links 
 

2002 albums
Atmosphere (music group) albums
Rhymesayers Entertainment albums